Hurricane Rita was the most intense tropical cyclone on record in the Gulf of Mexico and the fourth-most intense Atlantic hurricane ever recorded. Part of the record-breaking 2005 Atlantic hurricane season, which included three of the top ten most intense Atlantic hurricanes in terms of barometric pressure ever recorded (along with Wilma and Katrina), Rita was the seventeenth named storm, tenth hurricane, and fifth major hurricane of the 2005 season. It was also the earliest-forming 17th named storm in the Atlantic until Tropical Storm Rene in 2020. Rita formed near The Bahamas from a tropical wave on September 18, 2005 that originally developed off the coast of West Africa. It moved westward, and after passing through the Florida Straits, Rita entered an environment of abnormally warm waters. Moving west-northwest, it rapidly intensified to reach peak winds of 180 mph (285 km/h), achieving Category 5 status on September 21. However, it weakened to a Category 3 hurricane before making landfall in Johnson's Bayou, Louisiana, between Sabine Pass, Texas and Holly Beach, Louisiana, with winds of 115 mph (185 km/h). Rapidly weakening over land, Rita degenerated into a large low-pressure area over the lower Mississippi Valley by September 26th.

In Louisiana, Rita's storm surge inundated low-lying communities along the entire coast, worsening effects caused by Hurricane Katrina less than a month prior, such as topping the hurriedly-repaired Katrina-damaged levees at New Orleans. Parishes in Southwest Louisiana and counties in Southeast Texas where Rita made landfall suffered from severe to catastrophic flooding and wind damage. According to an October 25, 2005 Disaster Center report, 4,526 single-family dwellings were destroyed in Orange and Jefferson counties located in Southeast Texas. Major damage was sustained by 14,256 additional single-family dwellings, and another 26,211 single-family dwellings received minor damage. Mobile homes and apartments also sustained significant damage or total destruction.  In all, nine Texas counties and five Louisiana Parishes were declared disaster areas after the storm. Electric service was disrupted in some areas of both Texas and Louisiana for several weeks. Texas reported the most deaths from the hurricane, where 113 deaths were reported, 107 of which were associated with the evacuation of the Houston metropolitan area.

Moderate to severe damage was reported across the lower Mississippi Valley. Rainfall from the storm and its associated remnants extended from Louisiana to Michigan. Several tornadoes were also associated with the hurricane and its subsequent remnants. Throughout the path of Rita, damage totaled about $18.5 billion (2005 USD). As many as 120 deaths in four U.S. states were directly related to the hurricane.

Resulting from heavy destruction on the Gulf Coast, the name Rita was retired in the spring of 2006, and will never again be used for an Atlantic hurricane. It was replaced by Rina for the 2011 Atlantic hurricane season's list.



Meteorological history

On September 7, 2005, a tropical wave emerged off the west coast of Africa and moved westward into the Atlantic Ocean. Failing to produce organized, deep atmospheric convection, the disturbance was not monitored by the National Hurricane Center (NHC) for tropical cyclogenesis. Convection associated with the system increased briefly late on September 13 before dissipating shortly thereafter. At roughly the same time, a remnant surface trough had developed from a dissipating stationary front and began to drift westward north of the Lesser Antilles. Meanwhile, the tropical wave slowly became better organized and was first noted in the NHC's Tropical Weather Outlooks on September 15 while northeast of Puerto Rico. The wave merged with the surface trough two days later, triggering an increase in convective activity and organization. A subsequent decrease in wind shear enabled for additional organization, and at 0000 UTC on September 18, the NHC estimated that the storm system had organized enough to be classified as a tropical depression, the eighteenth disturbance during the hurricane season to do so.

In generally favorable conditions for tropical development, the depression quickly organized, and attained tropical storm strength at 1800 UTC that day based on data from reconnaissance flights and nearby ships and weather buoys. As a result, the tropical storm was named Rita. However, an increase in moderate southerly vertical wind shear as the result of a nearby upper-level low subdued continued intensification and displaced convective activity to the north of Rita's center of circulation. Once the upper-level low weakened, Rita's center of circulation reformed to the north, compensating for the disorganization that resulted from the wind shear. Consequently, the tropical storm resumed its previous strengthening trend as it was steered westward across The Bahamas along the south periphery of a ridge. Upon entering the Straits of Florida on September 20, Rita strengthened into a Category 1 hurricane by 1200 UTC, while maintaining a minimum barometric pressure of 985 mbar (hPa; 29.09 inHg). Aided by a favorable outflow pattern and anomalously warm sea surface temperatures (SSTs), the trend of rapid deepening continued, and Rita reached Category 3 status upon entering the Gulf of Mexico by 0600 UTC on September 21, making it a major hurricane.

Once in the Gulf of Mexico, Rita passed over the extremely warm Loop Current during the midday hours of September 21, enabling continued strengthening. As a result, the hurricane's wind field significantly expanded and the storm's barometric pressure quickly fell. By 1800 UTC that day, Rita attained Category 5 hurricane intensity, the highest category on the Saffir–Simpson hurricane wind scale. Favorable conditions allowed for additional development, and at 0300 UTC on September 22, Rita reached its peak intensity with maximum sustained winds of 180 mph (285 km/h) and a minimum barometric pressure of 895 mbar (hPa; 26.43 inHg), making it the strongest tropical cyclone ever recorded in the Gulf of Mexico. At the time, it was located 310 mi (500 km) south of the Mississippi River Delta.

Rita maintained Category 5 hurricane intensity for 18 hours before an eyewall replacement cycle took place, weakening the hurricane to Category 4 intensity by 1800 UTC on September 22. At the same time, the tropical cyclone began to curve northwestward around the southwestern periphery of a ridge of high pressure over the Southeastern United States. As a result of the cycle, a new, larger eyewall consolidated, resulting in Rita's wind field expanding. Due to wind shear and cooler continental shelf waters, the hurricane continued to weaken. Rita weakened to Category 3 strength before making landfall at 0740 UTC on September 24 in extreme southwestern Louisiana between Johnson Bayou and Sabine Pass.

Once inland on September 24, Rita began to rapidly weaken. The tropical cyclone had been downgraded to tropical storm intensity nearly 12 hours after landfall. Proceeding northward roughly parallel to the state border between Louisiana and Texas, radar imagery indicated that the storm soon lacked winds of tropical storm-force. Therefore, the NHC classified the system as a tropical depression while it was over Arkansas by 0600 UTC on September 25, shortly before it turned northeastward ahead of an approaching frontal boundary. Early the next day, the depression lost much of its convection over southeastern Illinois, and degenerated into a remnant low by 0600 UTC that day. The frontal boundary subsequently absorbed the remaining system six hours later over the southern Great Lakes region.

Preparations

Bahamas

At 0300 UTC on September 18, a tropical storm warning was issued for the Turks and Caicos and the Southeast and Central Bahamas. At the same time, a hurricane watch was also issued for the northwest Bahamas. By 0600 UTC the following day, the hurricane watch was upgraded to a hurricane warning for the northwest Bahamas excluding Grand Bahama and the Abaco Islands which were later put under a tropical storm warning. Several hours later, a hurricane warning was issued for Exuma and Andros Island. At 1800 UTC, the tropical storm warning for the Turks and Caicos was discontinued as the threat from Rita diminished. This discontinuation later included the southeast Bahamas. By 1500 UTC on September 20, all watches and warnings for the islands were discontinued as Rita moved into the Gulf of Mexico. Residents in the Bahamas were urged to board up their homes and stock up on emergency supplies. At least one shelter was opened and schools throughout the country were closed. The Nassau International Airport was also closed due to the storm on September 19 and would remain closed until the evening of September 20.

Cuba
Officials in Cuba warned residents of possible impacts from Rita and closed public facilities in northern areas. Some evacuations took place in villages near the northern coastline and several shelters were opened. An estimated 150,000 people were evacuated in northern Cuba ahead of the storm. About 600 shelters were opened in Havana which could house a total of 120,000 people. In western Cuba, more than 42,000 were given shelter in Matanzas, 31,000 in Villa Claro and 6,300 in Sancti Spiritus. In Havana, power was turned off at noon on September 19 to protect transformers, this also led to the disruption of natural gas lines. A large-scale preparation was put in place by the Ministry of Health in Cuba. A total of 14,859 medical personnel were mobilized to quickly assist residents impacted by Rita. The personnel consisted of 3,767 doctors, 5,143 nurses, 2,139 specialists, 1,072 health officials, and 2,738 other staff members. A total of 519 vehicles were also mobilized; it included 241 ambulances, 36 trucks, 21 panels, and 221 other vehicles. Throughout northern Cuba, a total of 1,486 shelters were opened, most of which were filled during the evacuation.

Florida

On September 18, when Rita was declared a tropical storm, phased evacuations began in the Florida Keys. All tourists were told to evacuate the Lower Keys immediately and residents in mobile homes were told to prepare to evacuate. By September 20, mandatory evacuations were in place for the 80,000 residents of the Keys. Both lanes on Route 1 were directed northbound to speed up evacuations. City busses picked up those who did not have transportation out of the Keys. An estimated 2.3 million people in Miami-Dade County were warned about the possibility of a direct hit on Miami and told to prepare to evacuate. A State of Emergency was declared ahead of Rita later that day by President George W. Bush. This would allow federal assistance to aid the affected areas in the wake of the storm. Throughout Florida, a total of 340,000 people were placed under mandatory or voluntary evacuation orders.

Five shelters were opened in southern Florida with a total capacity of 4,335 people. Tolls on northbound roads were lifted in Monroe County. A total of four hospitals, three assisted living facilities, and two nursing homes were evacuated. Military support in the form of 7,000 soldiers, eight Black Hawk helicopters, two Chinook helicopters, three Kiowa helicopters, one Huron aircraft, one Short 360 aircraft, one Hercules aircraft, and one Metroliner aircraft was provided. A task force was put on standby in Homestead Air Reserve Base to quickly deploy in affected areas.

The United States Department of Agriculture prepared food to deliver to affected areas after Rita. The United States Department of Defense deployed personnel to coordinate evacuations. The United States Department of Health and Human Services sent fully equipped medical teams and supplies if needed. The United States Department of Homeland Security pre-positioned over 100 trucks of ice and packed food to deliver following Rita. Two helicopters and one Cheyenne aircraft were also provided to assist with recovery efforts. The United States Department of the Interior shut down all national parks in Florida and evacuated workers in low-lying areas. Military cargo planes evacuated hospital patients from three acute-care hospitals in the Keys.

Louisiana

On Tuesday, Sept. 20th, Louisiana Governor Kathleen Blanco issued a state of emergency for all parishes in the southwestern region of Louisiana and requested in writing of President George W. Bush that he issue a federal state of emergency for the entire state. Refugees still at the New Orleans Convention Center and Superdome were being evacuated as a precaution, and national guard troops and other emergency personnel in for the Hurricane Katrina aftermath were being mobilized to evacuate. Select military personnel stayed in New Orleans for Hurricane Rita including Task Force California (2-185 Armor and 1-184 Infantry). 

By the morning of Wednesday, Sept. 21st, as Rita's strength, course and speed became clearer, officials of Cameron Parish, Calcasieu Parish, and parts of Jefferson Davis Parish, Acadia Parish, Iberia Parish, Beauregard Parish, and Vermillion Parish began to strongly encourage residents to evacuate ahead of the storm, with a 6:00 PM Thursday deadline set. Most residents followed the recommendations of their respective officials, hitting the road by the deadline, though many returned home and waited until early the next morning after encountering severe traffic delays. Southern Cameron Parish residents, used to frequent evacuations, were gone by noon on Thursday; when parish officials returned to the Hwy. 27 "Gibbstown Bridge" that crosses the Intracoastal Canal into Lower Cameron Parish two days later in preparation of damage inspection and rescue of any stranded and/or injured residents, no one was known to have remained.

Texas

Texas Governor Rick Perry recalled all emergency personnel, including almost 1,200 Texas National Guard, 1,100 Texas State Guard, and several hundred Texas Game Wardens from Katrina recovery efforts in anticipation of Hurricane Rita's arrival. In addition, the Federal Government deployed 11 Disaster Medical Assistance Teams (DMATs), staging them in mobile field hospitals across eastern Texas. The teams treated 7500 patients during the response. On September 22, Governor Perry and the Texas Department of Transportation implemented a contraflow lane reversal on Interstate 45 north towards Dallas, on Interstate 10 west towards San Antonio, U.S. Highway 290 northwest to Austin.

As part of the evacuation, Johnson Space Center in Houston handed off control of the International Space Station to their Russian counterparts.

Concerns had been raised over the state of the oil industry in response to Rita. The storm threatened a large amount of oil infrastructure that was left undamaged by Katrina. The Texas Gulf Coast is home to 23% of the United States' refining capacity, and numerous offshore production platforms were in Rita's path. A direct strike on Houston could disable more than a quarter of the United States' fuel-making capacity. Valero Energy Corp, the nation's largest refiner, stated on September 21 that Rita could have caused gasoline prices to rise well above $3 per US gallon ($0.79/L), at a time when the U.S. average price was $2.77/gal.

Mass evacuation
Just three weeks after Hurricane Katrina devastated the northern Gulf Coast, the threat of yet another major hurricane prompted mass evacuations in coastal Texas. An estimated 2.5 – 3.7 million people fled prior to Rita's landfall, making it the largest evacuation in United States' history.

Officials in Galveston County (which includes the city of Galveston), which was devastated by the Galveston Hurricane of 1900, ordered mandatory evacuations, effective September 21 at 6 p.m., in a staggered sequence. Officials designated geographical zones in the area to facilitate an orderly evacuation. People were scheduled to leave at different times over a 24-hour period depending on the zone in which the people were located. The scheduled times were set well in advance of the storm's possible landfall later in the week, but not soon enough to ensure that all residents could evacuate safely in advance of the storm. Nonetheless, many residents remained in the county because they were either unaware of the danger of the storm or believed that it was more important to protect their belongings, particularly in the wake of looting following Hurricane Katrina. The evacuation included transfer of all inpatients from the University of Texas Medical Branch hospital to other regional hospitals. 400 patients were prisoners under the ward of the Texas Department of Criminal Justice. These patients were systematically transferred to the University of Texas Health Center at Tyler.

Officials of Harris County hoped that the designation of zones A, B, and C would help prevent bottlenecks in traffic leaving the area similar to those seen at New Orleans prior to Katrina and Hurricane Dennis earlier that year. Also, people in certain zones were to be forced to go to certain cities in Texas and were not allowed to exit their designated routes except for food and gas — another feature of the evacuation plan which officials hoped would keep traffic flow orderly.

The evacuation-destination cities included Austin, College Station, San Antonio, Dallas, Huntsville, and Lufkin, Texas. Evacuees were asked to try hotels in the Midland/Odessa area when hotels began to sell out in other areas.

On Wednesday, Houston mayor Bill White urged residents to evacuate the city, telling residents, "Don't wait; the time for waiting is over," reminding residents of the disaster in New Orleans. After heavy traffic snarled roads leading out of town and gas shortages left numerous vehicles stranded, Mayor White backed off his earlier statement with, "If you're not in the evacuation zone, follow the news," advising people to use common sense. However, by 3:00 p.m. that afternoon, the freeway system in Houston was at a stand-still.

To the east of Houston, officials had set up evacuation routes in response to the slow evacuation of residents prior to Hurricane Lili. During the Rita evacuation, these preparations and their execution were overwhelmed by the enormous and unprecedented number of people fleeing from the Houston area prior to the departure of local residents. By the time Jefferson County began their mandatory evacuation, local roads were already full of Houstonians. Traffic on designated evacuation routes was forced to go far slower than the speeds experienced with any previous hurricane.

By late Thursday (22nd) morning, the contraflow lanes had been ordered opened after officials determined that the state's highway system had become gridlocked. The Texas Department of Transportation was unprepared to execute such a large-scale evacuation. Coordination and implementation of the contraflow plan took 8 to 10 hours as inbound traffic was forced to exit. Police were stationed to assist with traffic flow. Evacuees fought traffic Wednesday afternoon through mid-day Friday, moving only a fraction of the normal distance expected. Average travel times to Dallas were 24–36 hours, travel times to Austin were 12–18 hours and travel times to San Antonio were 10–16 hours, depending on the point of departure in Houston. Many motorists ran out of gas or experienced breakdowns in temperatures that neared . Traffic volumes did not ease for nearly 48 hours as more than three million residents evacuated the area in advance of the storm.

Evacuation deaths
As an estimated 2.5 – 3.7 million people evacuated the Texas coastline, a significant heat wave affected the region. The combination of severe gridlock and excessive heat led to between 90 and 118 deaths even before the storm arrived. Reports from the Houston Chronicle indicated 107 evacuation-related fatalities. Texas Representative Garnet Coleman criticized the downplay of the deaths in the evacuation and questioned whether the storm would be deadlier than the preparations. According to local officials, the traffic reached a point where residents felt safer riding out the storm at home rather than being stuck in traffic when Rita struck. Many evacuees periodically turned off their air conditioning to reduce fuel consumption as well as drank less water to limit the number of restroom stops. According to a post-storm study, which reported 90 evacuation-related deaths, nine people perished solely as a result of hyperthermia. However, it was suspected that most of the 67 deaths attributed to heat stress were a combination of hyperthermia and chronic health conditions. In addition to the heat-related deaths, 23 nursing home evacuees were killed after a bus caught fire on Interstate 45 near Wilmer. The bus erupted into flames after the vehicle's rear axle overheated due to insufficient lubrication. According to a resident near the site of the accident, there were three explosions. Many of the passengers were mobility-impaired making escape difficult or impossible. In June 2009, nearly four years after the fire, families of those who died in the accident won an $80 million settlement against the manufacturer of the bus and the company that provided the nursing home with it.

Impact

In some areas, the effects of Hurricane Rita were not nearly as severe as anticipated. The storm surge feared in Galveston and Houston struck farther east as the storm's center came ashore at the Louisiana border. Winds blowing offshore in Texas actually flattened the surge, which was only  in Galveston, well below the height of the seawall. The  of rain expected to fall overnight in New Orleans as Rita came ashore also did not happen, and the pressure on the levee system was eased. Still, a storm surge of up to  struck southwestern Louisiana, and coastal parishes experienced extensive damage. In Cameron Parish, the communities of Holly Beach, Hackberry, Cameron, Creole and Grand Chenier were essentially destroyed. There were also severe impacts, mainly due to wind, in inland parishes and counties across Southwest Louisiana and Southeast Texas, respectively. Cities such as Beaumont, Texas and Lake Charles, Louisiana, as well as surrounding communities, suffered extensive wind damage.

An estimated two million people lost electricity. Total damage is estimated at approximately $18.5 billion.

Deaths
The reported death toll for Hurricane Rita was 120. Only seven were direct deaths. One was caused by a tornado spawned in the storm's outer bands, one was due to storm surge flooding and three others were caused by trees blown down in the storm. The two Florida deaths both occurred in rip currents caused by Rita's distant waves.

Direct deaths are those caused by the direct effects of the winds, flooding, tornadoes, storm surge or oceanic effects of Rita. Indirect deaths are caused by hurricane-related accidents (including car accidents, crimes, fires or other incidents), cleanup and evacuation incidents and health issues (such as poisoning, illnesses, lack of emergency aid).

Caribbean
Strong winds were reported across the islands, but no damage resulted from the storm.

This resulted in significant structural damage but no loss of life. In the Bay Shore area of Havana, water levels rose and inundated 20 blocks of the city. An estimated 400,000 people in the city lost power a result of the storm. The torrential rains led to 34 homes collapsing in Havana.

Florida
Most of the Florida Keys received 3 in (76.2 mm) of rain or more. The highest sustained winds were recorded at 20:32 UTC (3:32 p.m. Minor erosion also occurred on south-facing beaches. At the height of the storm, an estimated 126,000 people were without power. One funnel cloud was reported along Interstate 95 in Lake Worth. High seas from Rita on September 22 flooded parts of coastal Walton County. Moderate beach erosion also occurred as a result of the high seas. Damages from the flooding estimated at $200,000. Damages in southern Florida were minimal. On September 24, strong rip currents produced by the remnants of Rita resulted in the death of one person near Miramar Beach.

Louisiana

With an estimated cost of $8 billion in damages, Hurricane Rita's impact across Louisiana varied. One person is known to have drowned during the event.  Due to the hurricane's storm surge, which topped levees and inundated low-lying coastal communities, the greatest amount of damage extended across most of southern Louisiana, from the Mississippi River delta to the Sabine River. Widespread power outages affected roughly 1 million customers, with Entergy Louisiana reporting the largest outage of 601,183 customers losing power.

In southeast Louisiana's Terrebonne Parish, storm surge reached  flooding an estimated 10,000 homes. Virtually every levee was breached. Some people were stranded in flooded communities and had to be rescued by boat. At least 100 people were reported rescued from rooftops. Already devastated by Hurricane Katrina, the Industrial Canal in New Orleans was again flooded by Hurricane Rita as the recently-and-hurriedly-repaired levees were breached once more.

In south-central Vermilion Parish, storm surge reached all the way up to the communities of Abbeville, Gueydan, and Lake Arthur. The  surge completely flooded Pecan Island, Intracoastal City, and Delcambre. Nearly all of the structures on Pecan Island were destroyed.  Rescue efforts were undertaken for up to 1,000 people stranded by local flooding. On Saturday, September 24 alone, 250 people were rescued.

However, the southwestern region of the state near where Rita made landfall was undeniably the worst impacted region in Louisiana.

In Cameron Parish, the damage was catastrophic, particularly along the coastline and north to the Intracoastal Waterway. The southern Cameron Parish communities of Cameron, Creole, Grand Chenier, Holly Beach, Johnson Bayou, Little Chenier and Oak Grove were either heavily devastated or entirely wiped out by the storm surge, with nearly 95 percent of homes, businesses, and infrastructure completely destroyed. Closer to the Intracoastal Waterway, communities shared a similar fate; Big Lake, Deatonville, Gibbstown and Hackberry were all devastated or heavily damaged. In Hackberry, an unofficial wind gust of 180 mph was recorded on a boat tied up to a local dock. Above the Intracoastal Waterway in northern Cameron Parish, the damage was devastating, with the communities of Grand Lake, Hebert's Camp, Lowry, Pelican Point, and Sweetlake suffering from extensive flooding and wind damage. Over a decade later, many communities south of the Intracoastal Waterway are still recovering, with their populations significantly lower than pre-Rita levels.

To the north in Calcasieu Parish, the cities and communities of Iowa, Lake Charles, Moss Bluff, Sulphur, and Westlake suffered severe wind damage, and some areas also received flooding due to both storm surge and heavy rain. A casino boat secured at the north end of the lake, and several barges secured at the Port of Lake Charles, broke free from their moorings, floating loose until running into the Interstate 10 bridge over the Calcasieu River, causing minor damage. Other areas of Lake Charles also experienced severe flooding, with reports of water rising 6–8 feet, at one point inundating the lower floors of the Lake Charles Civic Center. At a hotel on a section of the Contraband Bayou near Interstate 210 and Prien Lake Road, water reportedly rose as high as the second floor. There was extensive minor-to-major structural wind damage across the entire area, including the near-devastation of the Lake Charles Regional Airport south of the city. Damage to the entire region's electrical and communications infrastructure was severe, and authorities warned returning residents that restoration of services to some areas would take weeks to months.

In the western Calcasieu parish communities of Vinton and Starks, wind damage was also severe. The roof was torn off of the Vinton Recreation Center, and many homes were damaged by fallen trees and utility poles. Damaged utility towers made power restoration problematic, with much of the area waiting months for utilities to be restored.

Allen, Beauregard, Jeff Davis, and Vernon parishes suffered lesser, yet still significant, degrees of wind damage and flooding damage due to heavy rain.

After weakening to a tropical storm, Rita entered DeSoto and Caddo Parishes. The center passed just west of Downtown Shreveport before crossing the Arkansas border. At the height of the storm, over 175,000 people had lost power in the National Weather Service Shreveport's forecast area, mainly across Deep East Texas into northwest Louisiana. Two fatalities occurred in the Ark-La-Tex. A tree fell on one person; the other fatality occurred when a teenager was electrocuted when picking up a "hot" power line. Shreveport recorded its 2nd lowest pressure ever recorded as the center of Rita moved through Shreveport around 6 pm Saturday evening.

Mississippi
The heavy rainfall caused significant flooding in Yazoo and Warren Counties. In Yazoo, numerous homes had water inside and countywide damage amounted to $6 million. Damage in Warren County was less than Yazoo, amounting to $2.7 million. Holmes, Hinds and Madison Counties also had flooding, with damage in all three counties amounting to $2 million. Several roads were also flooded in Monroe County after  of rain fell. Winds up to  downed numerous trees throughout the state. In Adams County, winds caused several trees to fall on homes in Natchez, leaving $270,000 in damage. In Warren County, a mobile home was destroyed after a tree was downed by high winds.

An unusually large amount of tornadoes touched down in the state due to Rita, with 49 confirmed in Mississippi alone. The size of the tornado outbreak ranked it as the largest recorded by the National Weather Service office in Jackson. Damage from tornadoes alone in the state amounted to $14.5 million.
An F1 tornado killed one person after tossing a mobile home into the air and destroying it. Two other occupants sustained serious injuries. Another F1 tornado struck a mobile home park, destroying eleven homes, injuring seven people and leaving $2 million in damages. Six F2 tornadoes touched down in Mississippi. The tornado caused $2.5 million in damage and injured three people after destroying one building and severely damaging several homes and farms. Throughout the state, 2,127 residences lost power due to high winds.

Texas

The impact of Rita, limited to Southeast and East Texas, varied, with both wind and storm-surge damage impacting communities in various ways. Communities near and along the west side of the Sabine River, from the Gulf coast up to Toledo Bend Reservoir, saw the greatest measure of damage. The worst damage in the state occurred in several counties in Southeast Texas, including Jefferson, Orange, Hardin, Jasper, Newton, and Tyler counties, where damage to electrical and communication services was severe. Power was not restored in some areas across the region for weeks to even months. Cities in the "Golden Triangle" formed by Beaumont, Port Arthur, and Orange, TX sustained extensive wind damage, whether directly from wind or collaterally from wind-fallen trees, tree branches and/or other detritus. In Beaumont, an estimated 25% of the trees in neighborhoods across the city were uprooted or heavily damaged, and in Groves (home of "The Texas Pecan Festival"), about the same percentage of pecan trees suffered similar fates. The water treatment plant in Port Neches was heavily damaged. Governor Rick Perry declared a nine-county disaster area as a result of the significant damage in those communities.

In Galveston, Texas, parts of the coast not protected by the sea wall experienced minor storm-surge flooding. At the height of Rita's landfall, a fire broke out in the Strand Historic District; the Galveston fire department reacted quickly and was able to contain and douse the wind-whipped blaze, limiting damage and preventing the fire from spreading throughout the city. Luckily, no serious injuries were reported, though several historic buildings were either gutted or damaged; a fire-weakened wall of the vacated Yaga's Cafe and Bar collapsed several hours later, likely due to lingering wind gusts.

For the most part, Houston escaped major damage, apart from extensive power interruptions. A few windows blew out of some downtown skyscrapers, and some trees and traffic signals were downed or damaged. Thirty-one deaths in Harris County were attributed to Rita, mostly related to the evacuation and cleanup.

A number of news outlets reported on Sunday, September 25, 2005, that the discharge put lives at risk downstream and threatened a major bridge. Repairs to the dam were expected to take months to complete. After water levels were lowered and an inspection was conducted by national and local experts, the dam was declared stable late on Monday, September 26, 2005.

Rita's landfall in extreme Southwest Louisiana spared southeast and east Texas far greater damage from storm surge. In particular, Texas's coastal communities around Galveston Bay, located to the west of where the storm came ashore, were largely protected from Rita's storm surge by her fortuitous path. However, Sabine Pass experienced a significant storm surge, which destroyed much of the community. The town was featured on an episode of Extreme Makeover: Home Edition, which built a new fire station in the community. The new fire station was later destroyed in Hurricane Ike, which struck the Texas coast in 2008.

Prudently, a mandatory evacuation of Southeast Texas had been issued before Rita's landfall by both local and state governments. As a result of Governor Perry's disaster declaration, many residents displaced by, and/or returning home to the aftermath of Rita were able to take advantage of up to 60 days of hotel rooms, generators, chainsaws, and monetary assistance by FEMA.

Elsewhere
As Hurricane Rita passed to the south of Florida on September 20, outer bands to the north produced minor rainfall in parts of southern Georgia, peaking near . In Alabama, the storm produced 22 weak tornadoes, mainly rated F0, causing minor isolated damage amounting to roughly $1.2 million. Heavy rains also fell in association with Rita in the state. The remnants of Rita had little impact in Tennessee, only consisting of moderate rainfall, peaking near .

The weakened remnants of Hurricane Rita produced heavy rainfall and several tornadoes on September 24 in Arkansas. Three F2 tornadoes touched down in the state, the first injured five people in Lonoke County, the second was a low-end F2 tornado that completely destroyed a double-wide mobile home. The third was rated as a high-end F2 with winds near ; it destroyed three structures and severely damaged several others. Damage in Arkansas amounted to roughly $1 million.

Aftermath

Retirement
Resulting from heavy destruction on the Gulf Coast, the name Rita was retired in the spring of 2006, and will never again be used for an Atlantic hurricane. It was replaced by Rina for the 2011 Atlantic hurricane season's list.

Economic effects

The heavy concentration of oil infrastructure in the Gulf of Mexico makes hurricanes of Rita's intensity very problematic. Rita's path travelled through a dense area of offshore pipelines and oil platforms, and on land to an area with large refineries. With over half of Gulf production still shut down in the wake of Katrina, some economists have stated that a worst-case scenario is for gasoline prices to briefly touch $5/US gallon ($1.30/L), which would be easily the highest real price for gasoline paid in the United States during the internal combustion era. The most serious incident was the capsizing of the tension-leg platform Typhoon. Despite this, post-storm predictions estimated only minor price rises. With some 200,000 jobless claims attributed to Katrina, Rita may have been a further drag on a weakened US economy.

The most pessimistic projections had GDP growth cut by 1% on an annualized basis in the United States in the second half of 2005, with as many as 500,000 people made unemployed. Some economists argued that the rebuilding effort could buoy the economy in 2006, while others argued that the energy spike could decrease consumer confidence by enough to send the economy into a full-fledged recession when combined with the Federal Reserve's recent increases in interest rates. While the above did happen, it did not occur until 2008, nearly three years after Rita's impact.

Due to the impending oil shortage and increasing gas prices, Georgia Governor Sonny Perdue declared what he termed "snow days," closing all Georgia public primary and secondary schools on September 26 and 27 to conserve fuel for buses.

The combined effect of Hurricanes Katrina and Rita was the destruction of an estimated  of coastal wetlands in Louisiana.

Military relief operations

On September 24, 2005, following the havoc caused by Hurricanes Katrina and Rita, the National Guard named Brig. Gen. Douglas Pritt of the 41st Brigade Combat Team, Oregon Army National Guard, head of Joint Task Force Rita (formally called JTF Ponchartrain). The 1,400 Oregonian soldiers and airmen, including the 1st Battalion of the 186th Infantry which is designated a quick response unit, are joined by engineers and military police from Louisiana, the 56th Stryker brigade from Pennsylvania, and an engineering battalion from Missouri. It is their mission to provide relief support for all of the areas in Texas and Louisiana affected by the two storms and to remove obstructions that might otherwise hinder help to those affected.

American Red Cross operations
The American Red Cross continued to provide disaster relief to Hurricane Katrina affected areas, but as a result of Hurricane Rita, had to open additional shelters in other gulf states. The Red Cross also expanded their Hurricane Katrina internet "Safe List" for use by those affected by Hurricane Rita.

AmeriCorps relief operations
AmeriCorps sent several crews to Texas, Mississippi and Louisiana in response to Hurricane Katrina and Hurricane Rita. The crews originated from two main organizations, the National Civilian Community Corps (NCCC) and the Washington Conservation Corps (WCC), as well as from smaller Americorps organizations such as Americorps St. Louis' Emergency Response Team (ERT). The crews performed a number of relief tasks for hurricane survivors, including support on the Federal Emergency Management Agency (FEMA)/Carnival Cruise Lines shelter ship, tarping damaged roofs, and debris removal. As of the beginning of 2006, AmeriCorps teams have been involved in the rebuilding efforts in Louisiana and Mississippi. Teams have also operated volunteer camps like Camp Premier as well as assisted with the Made with Love cafe. As of May 2006, AmeriCorps reported that it would continue to send relief to affected areas.

See also

 Tropical cyclones in 2005
 List of Category 5 Atlantic hurricanes
 List of Florida hurricanes (2000–present)
 List of Texas hurricanes (1980-present)
 Hurricane Wilma (2005) – A Category 5 hurricane that broke the record for the most intense Atlantic hurricane later in the season
 Hurricane Laura (2020) – A Category 4 hurricane that devastated similar areas
 Timeline of the 2005 Atlantic hurricane season

Notes

References

External links

 The NHC's archive on Hurricane Rita
 The HPC's archive on Tropical Depression Rita
 The HPC's rainfall page for Rita
 Hurricane Rita: from wreckage to rebirth, from The Beaumont Enterprise
 NewsNow.co.uk's Hurricane Watch newsfeed
 The Disaster Center's Rita coverage
 TAOS Autorun - Real-time damage estimates
 Hurricane Rita Supply Availability Map
 "The Oil Drum: Rita Resource Page for Oil and Natural Gas Infrastructure Damage" The Oil Drum: Rita Oil and Gas Resources
 Research Model Advances Hurricane Intensity Prediction
 Increasing destructiveness of tropical cyclones
 Changes in Tropical Cyclone Number, Duration, and Intensity in a Warming Environment
 Beyond Katrina - Hurricanes Rita and Katrina, continuing recovery news, information, and resources five years post 
 Science Magazine Katrina/Rita page
 Color Enhanced Infrared Satellite Video of Hurricane Rita
 Hurricane Digital Memory Bank Preserving the Stories of Katrina, Rita, and Wilma
 Workforce Redevelopment in the Gulf Coast
 Hurricanes Katrina & Rita Web Archive

 
Retired Atlantic hurricanes
2005 Atlantic hurricane season
Category 5 Atlantic hurricanes
Lake Charles, Louisiana
Hurricanes in Florida
Hurricanes in Mississippi
Hurricanes in Louisiana
Hurricanes in Texas
Hurricanes in Arkansas
September 2005 events in the United States
Rita